As a general surgical technique, enucleation refers to the surgical removal of a mass without cutting into or dissecting it.

Removal of the eye

Enucleation refers to the removal of the eyeball itself, while leaving surrounding tissues intact.

Removal of oral cysts and tumors

In the context of oral pathology, enucleation involves surgical removal of all tissue (both hard and soft) involved in a lesion.

Removal of uterine fibroids (leiomyomata)

Enucleation is the removal of fibroids without removing the uterus (hysterectomy), which is also commonly performed.

References

Surgical procedures and techniques